Dalton Hoffman (born December 23, 1941) is a former American football fullback. He played for the Houston Oilers from 1964 to 1965.

References

1941 births
Living people
American football fullbacks
Baylor Bears football players
Houston Oilers players
Edmonton Elks players